Salisbury Island is located inside the Port of Durban on the east coast of South Africa; it is a former island until the Second World War when construction of a naval base connected it to the mainland by a causeway. The island, then a mangrove-covered sandbank, was named after , the Royal Navy ship that surveyed the future harbour area for the newly established Port Natal Colony in the 1820s.

Second World War and after
Naval Base Durban was constructed for the Royal Navy during the Second World War in response to the threat of Japanese attacks on shipping along the east coast of Africa. It was during this construction that the island became a peninsula through the construction of a causeway. After the war the base was turned over to the South African Naval Service (SANS), which has since maintained a fluctuating and intermittent presence.

With the signing of the Simonstown Agreement in 1957, the Royal Navy gave up its control of the SANS in exchange for the use of the base at Simon's Town. The SANS became the South African Navy (SAN) and Salisbury Island its main base. When the Simonstown Agreement ended the SAN moved most of its operations to Simon's Town and Durban became a secondary facility.

University College for Indians
In 1961, the University College for Indians was established on Salisbury Island. It closed down in 1971, when it was replaced by the University of Durban-Westville. Under apartheid the different population groups in South Africa had to have separate facilities. The college was the first fully fledged tertiary educational institution for Indian South Africans. Students used to commute to the college by ferry or boarded in hostels on the island. 

Alumni of the college include Pravin Gordhan, the former Minister of Finance, Roy Padayachie, the former Minister of Public Service and Administration, and author and curator Sarat Maharaj.

Naval base again
From the mid 1970s until the early 1990s, it was the home base of the Minister class strike craft flotilla. Upon the retirement of the strike craft, all combat ships of the navy were based at Naval Base Simon's Town and the Durban base was reduced to a naval station in 2002. Some of the facilities of the base were then taken over by the army as a general support base. In 2012, a decision to base the navy's offshore patrol flotilla in Durban led to a programme of renovation to restore the facility back to full naval base status. In December 2015, it was redesignated a naval base as the home port of the patrol flotilla.

References

Indian Ocean islands of South Africa
Former islands
Ports and harbours of South Africa